The following is a list of series currently or formerly broadcast by Investigation Discovery (ID), a channel dedicated to true crime documentaries that launched in 2008. Most of ID's programs are original productions, but it also airs re-titled off-network reruns, including ABC's 20/20, CBS's 48 Hours, and NBC's Dateline.

On June 7, 2015, ID aired its first ever scripted mini-series; Serial Thriller: Angel of Decay chronicled the investigation of convicted (and later executed) serial killer Ted Bundy. A second installment, Serial Thriller: The Chameleon, premiered as a two-part miniseries in December 2015, chronicling the crimes that resulted in the execution of American serial killer Stephen Morin. A third installment, Serial Thriller: The Headhunter, about serial killer Edmund Kemper (which possibly includes the story of serial killer Herbert Mullin), premiered on February 20, 2016.

Current programming

A Time To Kill (2020–present)
American Detective with Lt. Joe Kenda (2022–present)
American Monster (2016–present)
Black Widows: Kiss, Marry, Kill (2022–present)
Blood Relations (2022–present)
Body Cam (2018–present)
Body Cam: On the Scene (2022–present)
Calls From the Inside (2021-present)
Caught in the Net (2022-present)
Crime Scene Confidential (2022-present)
Crimes Gone Viral (2020-present)
Crimes Gone Viral: Eyewitness (2022-present)
Dead Days of Summer (2022–present)
Deadly Affairs: Betrayed by Love (2021–present)
Deadly Sins: No Forgiveness (2022–present)
Deadly Women: Fatal Instincts (2022-present)
Death by Fame (2023-present)
Death in the Deep South (2023–present)
Devil in Suburbia (2022–present)
Devil in the Web (2022–present)
Disappeared (2010–18, 2022–present)
Evil Lives Here (2016–present)
Evil Lives Here: Shadows of Death (2020–present)
Fear Thy Neighbor (2014–present)
I (Almost) Got Away With It: Confessions (2022–present)
I Went Undercover (2022–present)
In Pursuit with John Walsh (2019–present)
Killer Attraction (2023–present)
Killer Cheer (2023-present)
Love You to Death (2022–present)
Mean Girl Murders (2023-present)
Murder in the Heartland (2017–present)
Murder in the Wicked West (2022–present)
The Murder Tapes (2019–present)
Murder Under the Friday Night Lights (2022–present)
No One Can Hear You Scream (2022–present)
On the Case with Paula Zahn (2009–present)
People Magazine Investigates (2016–present)
People Magazine Presents: Crimes of the '90s (2022–present)
Real PD: Kansas City (2021–present)
Real Time Crime (2022–present)
Reasonable Doubt (2017–present)
Scorned: Fatal Fury (2022–present)
See No Evil (2015–present)
Signs of a Psychopath (2020–present)
Sins of the Father (2022–present)
Still A Mystery (2019–present)
True Conviction (2018–present)
The Playboy Murders (2023-present)
Vanished Into Thin Air (2022–present)
What's Your Emergency? (2022–present)
Where Murder Lies (2021–present)
Who the (Bleep) Did I Marry? (2010–15, 2022–present)

Upcoming programming
Undercover Underage (May 1, 2023)

Former programming

The 1980s: The Deadliest Decade (2016–17)1990s: The Deadliest Decade (2018-19)
50 Ways To Leave Your Lover
A Checklist for Murder (2015)
A Crime to Remember (2013–18)
A Deadly Dose (2020)
A Stranger In My Home (2013–16)
An American Murder Mystery (2016–20)
Alaska: Ice Cold Killers (2012–17)
American Nightmare (2019)
American Occult (2010)
Atlanta Justice (2020-21)
Bad Blood (2015–17)
Bad Teachers (2014)
Barbara Walters Presents American Scandals (2015–16)
Beauty Queen Murders (2013–14)
Before I Die (2019)
Behind Mansion Walls (2011–13)
Betrayed (2016–20)
Big Law: Deputy Butterbean (2011)
Blood Relatives (2012–17)
Blood Runs Cold (2018)
Blood, Lies, and Alibis (2013–14)
Bloodlands (2014)
Breaking Homicide (2018–19)
Breaking Point (2015)
Bride Killa (2018)
Broken Trust (2018)
The Bureau (2009–10)
Call 911 (2008–09)
The Case That Haunts Me (2018–20)
Catch My Killer (2013)
Caught on Camera: The Untold Stories (2019)
Cell Block Psychic (2014)
Chaos in Court (2020-22)
Chasing Justice with Dan Abrams (2010–11)
Cold Blood (2008–12)
Cold Hearted (2018)
The Coroner: I Speak for the Dead (2016–18)
Crime Scene University (2008)
The Crimes That Changed Us (2020)
Cry Wolfe (2014–16)
Cuff Me If You Can (2011)
Dallas DNA (2009)
Dangerous Persuasions (2013–15)
Dark Minds (2012–14)
Dark Side Of (2019)
Dark Temptations (2014)
Dark Waters: Murder In the Deep (2018–19)
Dates From Hell (2012–14)
Dead North (2018)
Dead Reckoning (2020)
Dead Silent (2016–21)
Dead of Night (2013-14; 18-19)
Dead of Winter (2019-20)
Dead on Arrival (2014)
The Deadliest Decade (2016–19)
Deadline: Crime With Tamron Hall (2013–17; 2019)
Deadly Affairs (2012–14)
Deadly Deception (2018-19)
Deadly Demands (2016)
Deadly Dentists (2017)
Deadly Devotion (2013–15)
Deadly Doctors (2016) 
Deadly Legacy (2018)
Deadly Recall (2019–20)
Deadly Secrets (2019)
Deadly Sins (2012–17)
Deadly Women (2005-21)
Death By Gossip with Wendy Williams (2015)
Desperate Measures (2013)
Detective (2017)
Detective Diaries (2021)
The Detectives Club: New Orleans (2017)
Devil Among Us (2020)
Devil in the Details (2014)
The Devil Speaks (2018–19)
The Devil You Know (2011–13)
Diabolical (2018–20)
Did He Do It? (2015)
Dirty Little Lies (2012)
Do Not Disturb: Hotel Horrors (2015)
Double Cross (2013)
Dream Killer (2016)
Elder Skelter (2013)
Evil-in-Law (2013–14)
Evil, I (2012–13)
Evil Kin (2013–16)
Evil Stepmothers (2016–18)
Evil Talks: Chilling Confessions (2018)
Evil Twins (2012–18)
Extreme Forensics (2008–10)
Extreme Measures (2018–19)
The Face of Evil (2019)
Facing Evil with Candice DeLong (2010–15)
The Family I Had (2017)
Fatal Encounters (2012–13)
Fatal Vows (2012–2020)
FBI: Criminal Pursuit (2011–13)
Fear Thy Roommate (2020–21)
Final Cut (2012)
Final Vision (2017)
Forbidden (2013)
Forbidden: Dying for Love (2016–19)
Forensics: You Decide (2009)
Frenemies: Loyalty Turned Lethal (2013–14)
Gang Nation (2009)
The Golden State Killer: It's Not Over (2018)
Gone (2017)
Grave Mysteries (2017–19)
Grave Secrets (2016–18)
Guilty Rich (2017)
Handsome Devils (2014)
Happily Never After (2012–14)
Hardcover Mysteries (2010)
Hate In America (2016)
He Lied About Everything (2018)
Hear No Evil (2017)
Heartbreakers (2014)
Heart of Darkness (2019)
Hell House (2015)
Highway to Hell (2019)
Home Alone (2017–18)
Home Sweet Homicide (2019)
Hometown Homicide (2019–20)
Hometown Homicide: Local Mysteries (2020)
Homicide Hunter (2011–20)
Homicide City (2018–20)
Homicide City: Charlotte (2019–20)
Hookers: Saved on the Strip (2010)
Horror at the Cecil Hotel (2017)
Hostage: Do or Die (2011–12)
House of Horrors: Kidnapped (2014–16)
How (Not) to Kill Your Husband (2014–16)
I (Almost) Got Away with It (2010–16)
I Am Homicide (2016–17)
I Didn't Do It (2011–12)
I Escaped: Real Prison Breaks (2010–11)
I Married a Mobster (2011–12)
I, Witness (2017)
ID Breaking Now (2020)
I'd Kill for You (2013–16)
If I Should Die (2020)
Impact of Murder (2019–20)
Impostors (2014)
In Plain Sight (2018–19)
Indecent Proposal (2015)
The Injustice Files (2011–14)
Inside Homicide (2014)
The Interrogator (2019)
In the Line of Fire (2016)
James Elroy's LA: City of Demons (2011)
Jared from Subway: Catching a Monster (2023)
Joe Exotic: Tigers, Lies and Cover-Up (2020)
Judgement Day: Prison or Parole? (2016)
Karma's a B*tch! (2013–14)
Keith Morrison Investigates (2017–20)
Ken and Barbie Killers: The Lost Murder Tapes (2021)
The Killer Beside Me (2018–20)
Killer Bods (2020)
Killer Carnies (2020)
Killer Clergy (2016)
The Killer Closer (2018)
Killer Confessions (2015)
Killer in Question (2020)
Killer Instinct with Chris Hansen (2015–17)
The Killer Nanny (2022)
Killer Trials: Judgment Day (2012)
Killer Truckers (2013)
Killer Unknown (2018)
Killing Fields (2016–17)
Killing Women with Piers Morgan (2016-17)
The Killing Hour (2015)
Killing Richard Glossip (2017)
Killing Time (2019)
Kiss of Death (2017)
The Lake Erie Murders (2018–20) 
The Last 24 (2018–19)
Last Seen Alive (2014)
The Lies That Bind (2019)
Living a Nightmare (2020)
Lone Star Justice (2019)
Love & Hate Crime (2018–19)
Love, Honor & Betray (2021)
Love Kills (2017)
Love the Way You Lie (2014)
Mail Order Murder (2014–15)
Main Street Mysteries (2010–11)
Man with a Van (2020)
Married With Secrets (2016–18)
Mary Kay Letourneau: Notes On A Scandal (2022)
Mansions & Murders (2015)
March to Justice (2013)
Mind of a Monster (2019–21)
The Mind of a Murderer (2015–16)
The Missing (2020)
Momsters: When Moms Go Bad (2014–15)
Most Evil (2014–15)
Most Infamous (2014–15)
Most Likely To... (2013)
Motives & Murders (2012–17)
Murdaugh Murders: Deadly Dynasty (2022)
Murder Among Friends (2016–17)
Murder Board (2019)
Murder Book (2014–16)
Murder by Numbers (2017–18)
Murder Calls (2017–18)
The Murder Castle (2017)
Murder Chose Me (2017–19)
Murder Comes Home (2020)
Murder Comes to Town (2014–18)
Murder Decoded (2019)
Murder in Amish Country (2019)
Murder in Paradise (2013–14)
Murder Is Forever (2018)
Murder Loves Company (2019)
Murder U (2014)
My Dirty Little Secret (2013–15)
My Family's Deadly Secret (2020)
My Murder Story (2020)
My Strange Criminal Addiction (2014)
Mystery Files (2010)
Never Say Goodbye (2019)
The Night That Didn't End (2018–20)
Nightmare Next Door (2011–16)
Nothing Personal (2011–12)
Nowhere to Hide (2014–15)
O.J. Simpson Trial: The Real Story (April 1, 2016) 
O.J.: Trial of the Century (June 12, 2014)
The Object of Murder (2019)
Obsession: Dark Desires (2014–17)
On Death Row (2012–13)
Over My Dead Body (2015)
Pandora's Box: Unleashing Evil (2016–18)
Paradise Lost (2016)
Passport to Murder (2016)
People Magazine Investigates: Crimes of Fashion (2018)
People Magazine Investigates: Cults (2018–19)
The Perfect Murder (2014–18)
The Perfect Suspect (2017–18)
Poisoned Passions (2013)
Power of Attorney: Don Worley (2021)
Predator at Large (2020)
Pretty Bad Girls (2012–13)
Pretty Dangerous (2013)
The Price of Glee (2023)
Primal Instinct (2018–19)
Prison Wives (2010)
Raw Terror (2020)
Real Detective (2016–17)
Real Interrogations (2008)
Real NCIS (2009)
The Real Story with María Elena Salinas (2017–18)
Real Vice Miami (2012)
Redrum (2013–15)
Reel Crime/Real Story (2012)
Relatively Evil (2019)
Scene of the Crime with Tony Harris (2017–18)
Scorned: Love Kills (2012–16)
Secret Lives of Stepford Wives (2014)
Secrets of the Morgue (2018–19)
Serial Killer: Devil Unchained (2019)
Serial Thriller (2015–16)
Sex Sent Me to the Slammer (2015)
The Shadows of Death (2019)
Shadow of Doubt (2016–17)
Shattered (2017–19)
The Shift (2008–10)
Sins and Secrets (2011–13)
Sinister Ministers (2014)
Sin City Justice (2016–17)
Six Degrees of Murder (2016–17)
Solved (2008–10)
Someone You Thought You Knew (2018–19)
Son of Sam: The Hunt for a Killer (2017)
Southern Fried Homicide (2013–15)
Southern Gothic (2020)
Southwest of Salem (2016)
Stalked: Followed by Fear (2021)
Stalked: Someone's Watching (2011–14)
Stolen Voices, Buried Secrets (2011-12)
Stranger Among Us (2020)
Street Justice: The Bronx (2017)
Sugar Town (2018)
Surviving Evil (2013–16)
Suspicion (2015–16)
Suspicious Minds (2020)
Swamp Murders (2013–17)
Tabloid (2015–16)
Tamron Hall Investigates (2017)
The Vanishing Women (2016)
The Will (2009–13)
Til Death Do Us Part (2019–21)
To Catch A Killer (2018)
Too Pretty to Live (2016)
Torn from the Headlines: New York Post Reports (2020)
True Crime with Aphrodite Jones (2011–16)
True Crime: Crime Scene Clean Up (2011)
True Nightmares (2015–16)
True Nightmares: Tales of Terror (2021)
Truth About Murder with Sunny Hostin (2019)
Truth Is Stranger Than Florida (2016)
Twisted (2010–14)
Twisted Love (2020)
Twisted Sisters (2018–20)
Twisted Tales of 9 to 5 (2015)
Two Shallow Graves (2022)
Unbreakable: Live to Tell (2019)
Unmasked (2018)
Unraveled (2015–16)
Until Proven Innocent (2016)
Untouchable: Power Corrupts (2015)
Unusual Suspects (2010–18)
Valley of the Damned (2019)
Vanity Fair Confidential (2015–18)
Very Bad Men (2010–14)
Village of the Damned: Welcome to Dryden (2017)
Web of Lies (2014–2019)
Welcome to Murdertown (2018)
What Lies Beneath (2018)
Who Killed...? (2020)
Who Killed Biggie and Tupac? (2022)
Who Killed Jane Doe? (2017–18)
Who the (Bleep)... (2013)
Wicked Attraction (2008–13)
The Wives Did It (2015)
Wives with Knives (2012–17)
Women in Prison (2015–16)
The Wonderland Murders (2018-19)
Worst Thing I Ever Did (2014)
Young, Hot & Crooked (2014)
Your Number's Up (2016)
Your Worst Nightmare (2014–20)

Reruns
20/20 on ID
48 Hours on ID
Dateline on ID

References

General

External links

ID